Military equipment of Turkey.

Turkish Land Forces

Turkish Air Force

Turkish Naval Forces

Gendarmerie General Command

Turkish Coast Guard Command

General Directorate of Security